The Code Reviser is an official in the government of the United States State of Washington charged with harmonizing the laws of the state and advising legislators on questions of style in the preparation of bills.

History

Establishment
In the first half-century of statehood, there was no official compilation of the laws of the state. Two private publishers independently compiled and published statutes enacted by the Washington state legislature into bound volumes: Remington Revised Statutes and Pierce's Perpetual Code. In 1951 the legislature enacted a common numbering system for the state's laws and published an official codex known as the Revised Code of Washington (RCW). The publication of the RCW was accompanied by the creation of the office of Code Reviser.

List of Code Revisers

Duties and office

The office of the Code Reviser is established in the Revised Code of Washington. They are appointed by the Statute Law Committee, which consists of four members of the legislature (two from each of the two largest political parties), an attorney appointed by the Washington State Bar, an attorney appointed by the Governor of Washington, a justice of the Washington Supreme Court (or an attorney appointed by the Chief Justice), and four professional staff members employed by the legislature. By law, the Code Reviser must be a lawyer; however, the functions of the office can also be delegated by the Statute Law Committee to a private legal publisher.

The Code Reviser is authorized to make minor style revisions to the laws of Washington as they are enacted by the legislature (for example, changing the words "effective date of this act" to an actual calendar date), correct obvious errors in laws enacted by the legislature such as incorrect citations and references, number and publish the Revised Code of Washington, and provide bill drafting advise to members of the legislature. The Code Reviser also appoints the editor of the Washington State Register, the state's government gazette.

The Code Reviser employs a professional staff of approximately 40 persons who operate in the Joel M. Pritchard Building in Olympia, Washington. As of 2003 the Code Reviser was paid an annual salary of $104,400; by 2011 this had increased to $120,106.

See also
 Law of Washington (state)

References